Nate Green (born December 2, 1977) is a current NBA referee and retired American basketball player who played professionally in the Australian National Basketball League, the NBA Development League and Italy's Lega Serie A.

Green, a 6'5" guard from Theodore Roosevelt High School in Des Moines, Iowa, played collegiately at Indiana State University in Terre Haute, Indiana from 1996 to 2000.  While there, Green was a four-year starter and as a senior in the 1999–2000 season led the Sycamores to the first NCAA tournament appearance in 21 years.  That year, Green averaged 16.8 points, 5.4 rebounds and 4.4 assists and was named the Missouri Valley Conference Player of the Year and defensive player of the year.  For his career, Green scored 1,182 points and is the school all-time co-leader in steals with 240 - a record he shares with Larry Bird.

Following the close of his college career, Green played in Australia's National Basketball League for the Canberra Cannons.  He then returned to the United States to play two seasons in the NBA Development League for the North Charleston Lowgators and the Columbus Riverdragons.  He then played several seasons in Italy's top league, averaging 20.5 points per game over seven seasons.

Green retired as a professional basketball player and now works as an NBA official.  He was inducted into the Indiana State Athletic Hall of Fame in 2012.

References

External links
Italian League stats
D-League statistics

1977 births
Living people
American expatriate basketball people in Australia
American expatriate basketball people in Italy
American men's basketball players
Basketball players from Des Moines, Iowa
Canberra Cannons players
Charleston Lowgators players
Columbus Riverdragons players
Fortitudo Pallacanestro Bologna players
Indiana State Sycamores men's basketball players
Olimpia Milano players
Pallalcesto Amatori Udine players
S.S. Felice Scandone players
Shooting guards
Theodore Roosevelt High School (Iowa) alumni